Antezumia is a monospecific neotropical genus of potter wasps restricted to the Amazonian basin. The sole species is Antezumia chalybea.

References

Biological pest control wasps
Potter wasps
Monotypic Hymenoptera genera